Little Choctawhatchee River is a  river in Alabama, United States. It empties into the Choctawhatchee River. Surveys of the river show it to be poor in invertebrates and high in pollutants.

References

Rivers of Alabama
Bodies of water of Dale County, Alabama
Bodies of water of Geneva County, Alabama
Bodies of water of Henry County, Alabama
Bodies of water of Houston County, Alabama
Alabama placenames of Native American origin